Dawan Station is a station of Line 2, Suzhou Rail Transit. The station is located in Xiangcheng District of Suzhou. It started service on December 28, 2013, the same time of the operation of Line 2.

Bus Connections
Connection Bus Stop: Dawan Bridge

Connection Routes: 80, 83, 84, 712, 811

References

Railway stations in Jiangsu
Suzhou Rail Transit stations
Railway stations in China opened in 2013